Rana El Nemr (Egyptian, b. 1974, Hanover, Germany) is an artist who lives and works in Cairo, Egypt. Working primarily in photography, she has undertaken explorations of contemporary Egyptian urban life, including Cairo's architectural features, public/private spaces, and middle-class identity. She is a founding member of The Contemporary Image Collective (CIC, Cairo), whose programming of lectures, screenings, and workshops explore the changing role of photography in contemporary visual culture.

Education and career
El Nemr studied photojournalism, advertising, and arts at the American University, Cairo. She has exhibited internationally, including in Lebanon, Switzerland, Germany, Japan, Finland, and the United States. One of El Nemr's noted series, The Metro, from 2003, presents women in traditional and non-tradition clothing in the Cairo subway, compositionally framed by the structure of the train cars.

Exhibitions and awards 
 2013 She Who Tells A Story: Women Photographers from Iran and the Arab World, Museum of Fine Arts, Boston
 2005 Grand Prix, African Photography Encounters Photography Biennale, Bamako, Mali

References

Bibliography 
 Aly, Doa (2017). Condemned to Depth: Invisible Architecture in Rana El Nemr's Streams of Synonyms. Ibraaz.

1974 births
Living people
21st-century women photographers
Artists from Hanover
Photographers from Cairo
Egyptian women photographers
The American University in Cairo alumni